Ângelo Matos Mendes Veloso (1930-1990) was a Portuguese politician.

A member of the Portuguese Communist Party since the days of the Estado Novo (New State) dictatorial fascist regime of António de Oliveira Salazar, Veloso was imprisoned in Peniche for political views. He was the communist presidential candidate in the 1986 Presidential Elections, having withdrawn in support of Francisco Salgado Zenha, during the 1st round of the election. He was one of the most prominent figures of the party and was scheduled to succeed Álvaro Cunhal but his premature death in 1990 made it impossible.

References

1930 births
1990 deaths
Portuguese anti-fascists
Portuguese Communist Party politicians
Candidates for President of Portugal
Portuguese prisoners and detainees